A paternoster (or ) or paternoster lift is a passenger elevator which consists of a chain of open compartments (each usually designed for two people) that move slowly in a loop up and down inside a building without stopping. Passengers can step on or off at any floor they like. The same technique is also used for filing cabinets to store large amounts of (paper) documents or for small spare parts. The much smaller belt manlift, which consists of an endless belt with steps and rungs but no compartments, is also sometimes called a paternoster.

The name paternoster ("Our Father", the first two words of the Lord's Prayer in Latin) was originally applied to the device because the elevator is in the form of a loop and is thus similar to rosary beads used as an aid in reciting prayers.

The construction of new paternosters was stopped in the mid-1970s out of concern for safety, but public sentiment has kept many of the remaining examples open. By far, most remaining paternosters are in Europe, with 230 examples in Germany and 68 in Czechia. Only three have been identified outside Europe: one in Malaysia, one in Sri Lanka and another in Peru.

History 
Peter Ellis installed the first elevators that could be described as paternoster lifts in Oriel Chambers in Liverpool in 1868. Another was used in 1876 to transport parcels at the General Post Office in London. In 1877, British engineer Peter Hart obtained a patent on the first paternoster. In 1884, the engineering firm of J & E Hall of Dartford, Kent, installed its first "Cyclic Elevator", using Hart's patent, in a London office block.

The newly built Dovenhof in Hamburg was inaugurated in 1886. The prototype of the Hamburg office buildings equipped with the latest technology also had a paternoster. This first system outside of Great Britain already had the technology that would later become common, but was still driven by steam power like the British systems.

The highest paternoster lift in the world was located in Stuttgart in the 16-floor Tagblatt tower, which was completed in 1927. This was replaced with conventional elevators in 1959.

Paternosters were popular throughout the first half of the 20th century because they could carry more passengers than ordinary elevators. They were more common in continental Europe, especially in public buildings, than in the United Kingdom.

Safety 
Paternoster elevators are intended only for transporting people. Accidents have occurred when they have been misused for transporting bulky items, such as ladders or library trolleys. The risk involved is estimated as 30 times higher than conventional elevators. A representative of the Union of Technical Inspection Associations stated that Germany saw an average of one death per year prior to 2002, at which point many paternosters were made inaccessible to the general public.

Due to the higher dangers compared to conventional elevators, the construction of new paternosters is no longer allowed in many countries. In 2012, an 81-year-old man was killed when he fell into the shaft of a paternoster in the Dutch city of The Hague. Elderly people, disabled people and children are most vulnerable.

In September 1975, the paternoster in Newcastle University's Claremont Tower was taken out of service after a passenger was killed when a car left its guide rail at the top of its journey and forced the two cars ascending behind it into the winding room above. In October 1988 a second, non-fatal accident occurred in the same lift. A conventional lift replaced it in 1989–1990.

In West Germany, new paternoster installations were banned in 1974, and in 1994 there was an attempt to shut down all existing installations. However, there was a wave of popular resistance to the ban, and to a similar attempt in 2015. , Germany had 231 paternosters.

In April 2006, Hitachi announced plans for a modern paternoster-style elevator with computer-controlled cars and standard elevator doors to alleviate safety concerns. A prototype was revealed . In 2009, Solon received special permission to build a brand new paternoster in its Berlin headquarters.

Surviving examples

Austria 
 In Vienna, the Vienna City Hall, the Ringturm (headquarters of the Vienna Insurance Group), an office building at Trattnerhof 2 near Stephansplatz and Haus der Industrie on Schwartzenbergplatz have the last four running and frequently used paternosters in the city. The university also had one or more.
 In Klagenfurt, the Headquarters of the energy company Kelag still have one paternoster active for daily use.

Belgium 
 A paternoster lift dating from 1958 survives in Avenue Fonsny 47, Brussels, a currently disused office building forming part of Midi/Zuid railway station.
 At the Huis van de Vlaamse Volksvertegenwoordigers (House of Flemish Representatives), previously the Postcheque Building, at Leuvenseweg/Rue de Louvain 86, the paternoster is operational but not used.

Czechia 
 Prague City Hall has an early 20th century paternoster renovated in 2017
 In Prague, Czech Technical University – Faculty of Electrotechnical Engineering at Technická 2, Dejvice
 In Prague, Charles University -–Faculty of Law
 In Prague, Ministry of Transport (Czech Republic) head office
 In Prague, Ministry of Agriculture (Czech Republic)
 In Prague, Lucerna Palace (near the southeast entrance)
 In Prague, Czech Radio building (oldest paternoster lift in the Czech Republic, not publicly accessible)
 In Brno, Brno Technical University – Faculty of Mechanical Engineering at Technická 2896/2
 In Brno, Brno Municipality – Malinovského nám. 624/3
 In Most, Business centrum, tř. Budovatelů 2957
 In the offices of Czech Post at Brno railway station, (returned to use in 2013, after being out of service for six years)
 In Jablonec nad Nisou, city hall built in 1933
 In Ostrava's New Town Hall built in 1930
 In Liberec, Liberec Regional Office building build in 1971, highest paternoster in Czechia (56.8 m high and has 35 wooden cabins)
 In Zlín, Baťa's Skyscraper or Building No. 21 built in 1938

Denmark 
 In the Christiansborg Palace where the Danish parliament resides
 At Vognmagergade 8. Today the building is used by KVUC – Københavns VUC (Copenhagen's adult-education center)
 In the corporate office building Axelborg, located in central Copenhagen
 In Frederiksberg Town Hall
 In the 11-story main administrative building at Danfoss headquarters on the island of Als
 In the hospital in Vejle
 Sydvestjysk Hospital in Esbjerg

Finland 

The following locations have paternosters:
 In Turku, Town hall in Yliopistonkatu 27
 In Helsinki, in the office building at Hämeentie 19
 In Helsinki, at Eduskunta, the parliament of Finland at Mannerheimintie 30, accessible to the representative members of parliament only
 In Helsinki, in Stockmann, Helsinki centre at Aleksanterinkatu 52, accessible to staff only

Germany 
 In Kiel, the State Parliament building for the state of Schleswig-Holstein has had a working paternoster since 1950.
 In Kiel, the city hall has had a paternoster in use for over 100 years.
 In Berlin, the offices of the alt-left newspaper Neues Deutschland contain a working paternoster, while those of the conservative tabloid Bild contain a 19-storey paternoster that is still in use but not open to the public. The Rathaus Schöneberg, including scenes with its paternoster elevator, were used to film the TV series Babylon Berlin.
 In Berlin, the building at Kleiststr. 23–26 that houses Argentina's embassy contains an 8-story paternoster.
 In the German Academy of Sciences in Berlin another paternoster is in use.
 Berlin's Flughafen Tempelhof through at least 1967 (when it shared an identity as Tempelhof Air Base) had at least 1 fully-functional paternoster in the tower on the left end (as seen from the Luftbrückeplatz) of the quarter-circular pre-WW2 building.
 Bremen has a paternoster in the Bremen Cotton Exchange, at Wachtstraße 17-24, just off the market square.
 In Hamburg, the building at 25 Deichstraße, Speicherstadt, has an operating paternoster, the Bezirksamt at Grindelberg 62–66 in Eimsbüttel and Hapag Lloyd buildings in Balindamm street also have a working Paternoster. As well as the building at Stadthausebrücke 8.
 In Cologne, the building at Hansaring 97 has a working and in-use paternoster.
 In Frankfurt, the former IG Farben Building has running and frequently used paternosters as seen in the movies "Berlin Express" (1948) and "Night People" (1954).
 In Jena, a paternoster is in use at the headquarters of Jenapharm.
 In Kassel, a paternoster is still in use at the headquarters of Wintershall Dea
 In Stuttgart, a paternoster is still in use at city hall (Stuttgart Rathaus).
 In Leipzig, a paternoster is still in use at city hall (Leipzig Neues Rathaus)

Hungary 
 In Jahn Ferenc hospital in Budapest.
 In Miskolc, the University of Miskolc, has a working and in-use paternoster.
 In the central office of National Tax and Duty Administration Budapest.
 In the headquarters of BKV Budapesti Közlekedési Zrt. in Budapest. (operating in 2020)
 In the Ministry of Education in Budapest (operating and in daily use in March 2022).
 In Kiskun County Hospital, Kecskemét

Netherlands 
In the Netherlands, seven paternoster lifts could be found in 2012, some of which were still operational:
 In the former Ziggo building at Spaarneplein 2, The Hague: no longer in use. (Stork Hijsch 1922, conversion 1976 Starlift, damage repair 1999 Schindler.) On 13 April 2012, a fatal accident occurred when an 81-year-old man was trapped between the lift and the wall.
 At the Dudokhuis, Tata Steel Europe in IJmuiden: shut down in 1999. (Eggers Kehrhan, 1957):
 In the HaKa building (the old head office of the Coöperatieve Groothandelsvereniging 'de Handelskamer' ) on the Vierhavenstraat in Rotterdam. This 1936 Hensen-Schindler lift has been operational again since the end of 2011, although the building is empty. For safety reasons, the lift can only be visited with the building manager. The lift can be put into operation for interested parties on request.
 In the former tax office on Puntegaalstraat in Rotterdam; it is put into operation during Heritage Days, but may not be used. To enforce this, gates have been built across the entrances. (Backer and Rueb Breda, 1948, conversion December 1975 by De Reus BV.)
 In the former post office on the Coolsingel 42 in Rotterdam: disused.
 Two examples in the Scheepvaarthuis (now Grand Hotel Amrâth Amsterdam) in Amsterdam: working, can be used on request. (Roux Combaluzier, 1928.)
 In the old school building on the Mauritskade in Amsterdam: whether the elevator is still working is unknown.

Norway 
In Oslo, Landbrukets hus, on Schweigaards Gate. The building was built in 1965 as the headquarters for Norges Bondelag, who vacated it in 2016.

Poland 
 Building of Silesian Parliament in Katowice.
 In Wrocław, Poland, Santander Bank building, Main Square. Available for employees only.

Russia 
 In the building of the Ministry of Agriculture in Moscow

Serbia 
 In Belgrade in the headquarters building of Serbian Railways there is one operating paternoster lift and another one which is not in service.

Slovakia 
 In Bratislava there are at least 5 operating paternosters: Ministry of Transport and Construction, Ministry of Interior, Ministry of Finance, Ministry of Agriculture and Rural Development and the headquarters of Railways of the Slovak Republic.
 In Košice, the Technical University of Košice operates a paternoster in the main building called L9 since 1972. There's another paternoster in an administrative building of U.S.Steel Košice, steel manufacturing company in Košice.

Sri Lanka 
 Ceylon Electricity Board Headquarters building in Colombo

Sweden 
 In Sweden there is at least one functional Paternoster lift at HSB-huset, Kungsholmen, Stockholm

United Kingdom 
Current
 The Arts Tower at the University of Sheffield has a paternoster, which is said to be the largest in Europe. It has 38 two-person cars and serves 22 storeys. A journey between two floors takes 13 seconds.
 Agenda 2020 – The Albert Sloman Library at the University of Essex on the Colchester campus has a working paternoster.
 Northwick Park Hospital in Harrow, North West London (part of the London North West University Healthcare NHS Trust) has the last working paternoster in London. It had been out of commission for many years until July 2020, when it was reopened for staff use.
Former
 On 8 December 2017 it was announced that the paternoster in the Attenborough tower at the University of Leicester which was constructed in 1968–70 would be taken out of service as maintenance had become too expensive. This was undertaken shortly afterwards.
 At the University of Birmingham, both the main library and the Muirhead Tower had paternosters. The library was demolished in 2017, and replaced with a new library. The paternoster in the Muirhead Tower was closed for many years before a major refurbishment added two new lifts.
 Birmingham Polytechnic (now Birmingham City University) had a paternoster in the 1970s in the Baker building on its City North Campus at Perry Barr. The building closed in 2018.
 Birmingham College of Food, Tourism & Creative Studies, Summer Row, Birmingham. (now University College Birmingham)
 Birmingham Dental School. The building was demolished during 2020–21
 London School of Economics. The Clare Market Building had a paternoster until 1991
 There was a paternoster in the Co-op's six-storey Fairfax House department store, in Bristol's Broadmead shopping centre. The store opened in March 1962 and was demolished in 1988.
Leeds University in the Roger Stevens building.
 Newcastle University's Claremont Tower paternoster had a fatal accident in September 1975 after a car left its guide rail at the top of its journey and forced the two cars ascending behind it into the winding room above. Another accident in 1988 led to its subsequent closure and removal.
 University of Glasgow. The Pontecorvo Building which housed The Institute of Genetics had a paternoster lift.
 Oxford University Department of Engineering Science. The Thom Building had a paternoster lift through into the 1980s, now replaced by a pair of conventional lifts.
 University of Salford Chemistry Tower had a paternoster lift. The building has been demolished.
 Risley, Cheshire – Former United Kingdom Atomic Energy Authority (UKAEA) site, now Birchwood Park Business Park.  The original management block 'A Block', and the later engineering building 'E Block'had paternoster lifts.  Those in the former E Block survived into the 21st century (sealed off), and may still exist.
 UKAEA Winfrith Heath Dorset 4 floor Administration Building
 Viscount House, a British Airways office building at Hatton Cross. Now demolished.
 Unipart House, Oxford had two of them. They were at each end of the building but were taken out due to the cost of maintenance. Bob Geldof and The Boomtown Rats filmed their video of Love or Something in them.

Gallery

See also 

 Escalator
 List of elevator manufacturers
 Shabbat elevator
 Revolving door

References

External links 

 A look at the last remaining paternoster lifts | Associated Press, 2017 (YouTube)
 Information and photos regarding the GEC Marconi paternoster featured in "The Prisoner" TV series

Elevators
Vertical transport devices
English inventions
1884 introductions
Articles containing video clips